In color science, the dominant wavelength is a method of characterizing a color's hue. Along with purity, it makes up one half of the Helmholtz coordinates. A color's dominant wavelength is the wavelength of monochromatic spectral light that evokes an identical perception of hue.

Determination

Helmholtz coordinates

The Helmholtz Coordinates are a Polar coordinate system for defining a 2D chromaticity plane. The circumferential coordinate is the dominant wavelength, which is analogous to hue of the HSL and HSV color spaces. The radial coordinate is the purity, which is analogous to saturation of the HSL and HSV color spaces.

Color space
Any chromaticity diagram from any color space can be used for calculating the dominant wavelength as long as it is bound by a spectral locus defined by wavelength. However, the values will change depending on which color space is used. Unless otherwise stated, the CIE 1931 color space (CIEXYZ) is used., but the CIELUV color space is sometimes used.

Calculation
To calculate the dominant wavelength of a chromaticity (or color), a straight line is drawn on the chromaticity diagram between the chromaticity's coordinates and the white point. The line is then extrapolated so it intersects the perimeter of the diagram at two points, where the perimeter comprises the spectral locus and/or line of purples. The point of intersection that is nearer to the chromaticity in question defines its dominant wavelength. The purity can then be calculated as defined here.

White point
The white point is generally defined as—or assumed to be—equal energy white. This is defined as [x,y]=(0.33,0.33) in CIEXYZ color space and is  analogous to the HSV white point at (0,0). However, other white points may be used, generally defined by "white" standard illuminants or a color temperature such as 6500K.

Complementary wavelength
When the chromaticity lies within the triangle with vertices at the white point, spectral blue (~400 nm) and pure spectral red (~700 nm), the dominant wavelength is indeterminate because the  point of intersection that is nearer to the chromaticity lies on the line of purples instead of the spectral locus. The colors on the line of purples cannot be defined by wavelength because they do not represent monochromatic light.

Instead, the dominant wavelength is replaced with the complementary wavelength, which will represent the complementary color. To calculate it, the point of intersection that is further from the chromaticity in question is used. If the nearer intersection is on the line of purples, the further intersection must be on the spectral locus.

Application
Dominant wavelength is used to define the color of light sources, such as the LEDs, that do not lie along the Planckian locus (which would otherwise be defined by Color temperature). These light sources are also often described by their peak wavelength—the wavelength of highest radiometric Spectral flux (highest peak in the power spectrum)—but the dominant wavelength is a photometric quantity, and therefore intuitively conveys what color the light will appear without relying on inexact color naming.

See also
 Hue
 Colorfulness
 White point

References

Color